I'm Still Here: The Truth About Schizophrenia is a documentary film about schizophrenia. This 65-minute, black-and-white film was written and directed by Robert Bilheimer. Bilheimer began working on the film soon after being nominated for an Academy Award for the film The Cry of Reason: Beyers Naude – An Afrikaner Speaks Out. Psychiatrist Stephen Mark Goldfinger cowrote the film.

The National Alliance for Research on Schizophrenia and Depression aided in the film's production, which was complete by 1992, despite the film not being released until 1996. The following year, a VHS recording of the film was distributed by Wheeler Communications. Susan Gingerich appears in the film, as does Fredrick J. Frese. A National Health Service Corps reviewer called the film "extraordinarily moving."

References

1996 documentary films
1996 films
American documentary films
Black-and-white documentary films
Documentary films about schizophrenia
Films directed by Robert Bilheimer
American black-and-white films
1990s English-language films
1990s American films
English-language documentary films